Turkish wine is wine made in the transcontinental Eurasian country Turkey. The Caucasus region, where Armenia, Azerbaijan, Georgia and Iran are located, played a pivotal role in the early history of wine and is likely to have been one of the earliest wine-producing regions of the world.

Ampelographers estimate that Turkey is home to between 600 and 1200 indigenous varieties of Vitis vinifera (the European grapevine), though less than 60 of these are grown commercially. With over  planted under vine, Turkey is the world's fourth-leading producer of grapes for wine production.

Mustafa Kemal Atatürk, Turkey's first president, established the country's first commercial winery in 1925. According to the OIV, the total wine production in 2005 was 28,700,000 litres. In the first half of 2009, wine consumption in Turkey reached 20,906,762 litres.

Climate and wine regions

The size and geography of Turkey accounts for the wide climatic variation of Turkey's wine regions. The wine regions of Thrace along the Sea of Marmara have slight Mediterranean climates that resembles those of neighboring southwest Bulgaria and northeast Greece. This area is responsible for nearly 40% of Turkey's wine production which also produces the most elegant and balanced wines in Turkey. The sub region of Thrace, Kirklareli, is known for her crisp white wines and fine reds.  The wine regions along the Aegean coast, mostly near İzmir, account for 20% of the country's wine production, and have much more pronounced Mediterranean climates with mild winters and warm, dry summers. The remaining portion of Turkey's wine production takes place in scattered pockets throughout the Eastern and Central Anatolia regions. The region of Central Anatolia is the most climatically difficult region to produce wine, with most vineyards being located at altitudes near 1,250 meters (4,000 feet) above sea level. Winter frost is a serious viticultural hazard, with winter temperatures often dropping to −25 °C (−13 °F). In the summer, grapes of this region can receive up to 12 hours of sunshine a day. The vineyards of Eastern Anatolia around Elazığ, Malatya and Diyarbakır are located in the Euphrates valley, which is one of the world's oldest wine regions and the anecdotal location of Noah's vineyards from the 9th chapter of Genesis.

Grapes and wine
With between 600 and 1200 indigenous grape varieties, there are numerous options that Turkish winemakers can pursue to make wine. Currently only 60 varieties are commercially cultivated. Some of the native Turkish varieties include the Yapıncak and Papazkarası grown in Thrace; the Sultaniye of the Aegean coast; the Öküzgözü and Boğazkere (used to make Buzbağ) of Eastern Anatolia; the Çalkarası of the Denizli Province in Western Anatolia, and the Kalecik Karası, Narince and Emir of Central Anatolia. In recent years, some of the international grape varieties have increased their presence, including Sémillon (known as Trakya), Riesling, Muscat, Gamay, Cinsault, Grenache, Carignan, Cabernet Sauvignon and Merlot.

Wineries

As of 2008, the largest winery of Turkey was operated by Tekel, which started as a state-owned monopoly. TTA/TEKEL alcoholic beverages section privatized by a block sale of 100% of shares for US$292 million to Nurol-Özaltın-Limak-Tütsab Consortium and the Share Purchase Agreement signed on February 27, 2004. Other notable wineries include Sarafin on the Gallipoli peninsula in Thrace, which was Turkey's first privately owned "boutique winery", Doluca of Thrace, Kavaklıdere of Ankara. Also Pamukkale Winery make wines. Sevilen Winery produces ten million bottles/year of wine. With a full brand new reception (double sorting table), the pre-fermentative process respects the integrity of the grapes, which are all hand-harvested. Newest in the Aegean is LA Organik which makes wine from organic grapes and has in their first year won international acclaim in Decanter magazine. Korubaşı Vineyards, is the smallest licensed boutique winery in Turkey. Situated 6 km from the ancient site of Assos, it was established in 2003 following a detailed soil analysis carried out at Ege University and U.C.Davis labs. Their first Merlot and Cabernet Sauvignon grapevines were planted in the spring of 2004, followed by Montepulciano and Sauvignon Blanc through the next six years, all on  R110 or R140 rootstocks as suggested by the soil analysis. Presently wine production is  limited to just under 10000 bottles annually. Korubaşı vineyards has medaled three times for their Doseluna wines at the prestigious International Wine Challenge in London.
 
Buzbağ is a full flavored red wine made from Boğazkere grapes grown in the Anatolia region of Turkey. The wine is a red wine with high tannic levels. It is sometimes produced in an ice wine fashion with the grapes allowed to hang on the vine till the first frost and then crushed while the grapes are still frozen. Historically, the area where Buzbağ is produced is considered a possible birthplace of wine. The biblical accounts of Noah after the flood has him planting a vineyard near the area where the ark landed. This area is presumed to be Mount Ararat where Buzbağ is still being produced today by the state run vineyards of Tekel near the town of Elazığ by the Euphrates river.

See also
History of wine
Rakı

References